Phyllalia alboradiata is a moth in the family Eupterotidae. It was described by Per Olof Christopher Aurivillius in 1911. It is found in South Africa.

References

Endemic moths of South Africa
Moths described in 1911
Eupterotinae